Theromaster brunneus is a species of armoured harvestman in the family Travuniidae. It is found in North America.

References

Further reading

External links

 

Harvestmen
Animals described in 1902